Arlene Ione Lehto (born September 14, 1939) was an American politician and businesswoman.

Lehto was born in Duluth, Minnesota and graduated from the Two Harbors High School in Two Harbors, Minnesota. She went to University of Minnesota Duluth majoring in speech and political science. Lehro also went to vocational school. Lehto lived with her husband and family in Duluth. She was a licensed cosmetologist and was in the printing business. Lehto served in the Minnesota House of Representatives from 1977 to 1982 and was a Democrat.

References

1939 births
Living people
American cosmetics businesspeople
Businesspeople from Minnesota
Politicians from Duluth, Minnesota
University of Minnesota Duluth alumni
Women state legislators in Minnesota
Democratic Party members of the Minnesota House of Representatives